Graham John Whiting (born 4 June 1946) is a New Zealand former rugby footballer. A prop, Whiting represented King Country in rugby union at a provincial level, and was a member of the New Zealand national side, the All Blacks, from 1972 to 1973. He played 31 matches for the All Blacks including six internationals.

Whiting later switched to rugby league, playing for the Maritime club in the Auckland Rugby League competition in 1975.

References

1946 births
Living people
Rugby union players from Whanganui
People educated at Taumarunui High School
New Zealand rugby league players
New Zealand rugby union players
New Zealand international rugby union players
King Country rugby union players
Rugby union props
Maritime rugby league team players